The Beginning is the debut studio album by Maltese pop singer Kevin Borg, which he earned  the right to record after winning Idol 2008 in Sweden where he is now residing. It was released in 2009.

Tracks 
 Street Lights
 A Hundred Different Ways
 Ready to Fly
 The Light You Leave On 
 Paint It Black
 Beating Me Up
 The Last Words
 Runegod
 3rd Wonder
 Kisses I Wanna Give Ye
 My Love
With Every Bit of Me

Chart positions

References 

2009 debut albums
Kevin Borg albums